Pavlo Hryshchenko (born 6 July 1990) is a professional Ukrainian footballer midfielder.

Club career
He is the product of the Metalurh Donetsk Youth school system.

In 2015 he was spotted to play for a team of Donetsk People's Republic.

References

External links
 Profile on Football Squads
 
 
 

1990 births
Living people
Sportspeople from Donetsk Oblast
Ukrainian footballers
Ukrainian expatriate footballers
Association football midfielders
FC Metalurh Donetsk players
FC Stal Kamianske players
FC Urartu players
FC Bukovyna Chernivtsi players
Daugava Rīga players
FC Okean Kerch players
Ukrainian Premier League players
Ukrainian First League players
Ukrainian Second League players
Crimean Premier League players
Ukrainian expatriate sportspeople in Armenia
Ukrainian expatriate sportspeople in Latvia
Expatriate footballers in Armenia
Expatriate footballers in Latvia